Nieves Hernández (30 October 1901 – 10 October 1986) was a Mexican footballer who represented his nation at the 1928 Summer Olympics in the Netherlands.

References

External links
 

1901 births
1986 deaths
Mexican footballers
Association football midfielders
Footballers at the 1928 Summer Olympics
Olympic footballers of Mexico
Mexico international footballers